Andreas Dietel (born 20 October 1959) is a German speed skater. He competed at the 1980 Winter Olympics and the 1984 Winter Olympics.

References

External links
 

1959 births
Living people
German male speed skaters
Olympic speed skaters of East Germany
Speed skaters at the 1980 Winter Olympics
Speed skaters at the 1984 Winter Olympics
People from Zwickau (district)
Sportspeople from Saxony